Scythris ceratella is a moth of the family Scythrididae. It was described by Bengt Å. Bengtsson in 2002. It is found in Yemen.

References

ceratella
Moths described in 2002